Wellfleet station was a train station located just to the east of the intersection of Commercial Street and Railroad Avenue in Wellfleet, Massachusetts. It was constructed in 1870 when the Cape Cod Railroad reached Wellfleet.

References

External links

Wellfleet, Massachusetts
Former railway stations in Massachusetts
Old Colony Railroad Stations on Cape Cod
Stations along Old Colony Railroad lines